Zeynab Yahya qizi Khanlarova (born 28 December 1936, Baku) is a Soviet and Azerbaijani singer (soprano), People's Artist of the USSR (1980), Azerbaijan (1975), Armenia (1978).

Biography
Zeynab Khanlarova was born on 28 December 1936, in Baku and was the youngest of the family's five children. In 1956, Zeynab Khanlarova graduated from Baku Pedagogical School named after M.A.Sabir. In 1961, she graduated from Baku Musical School named after Asaf Zeynally (S.I.Shushinski's class) and became a soloist of the Azerbaijan State Academic Opera and Ballet Theater.

Zeynab Khanlarova was the deputy of Supreme Soviet of Azerbaijan SSR (XI-XII convocations) and the National Assembly of Azerbaijan (I-III convocations).

Musical career
Zenab Khanlarova played Leyli's part in "Leyli and Majnun" opera, Asli's part in "Asli and Karam" opera of Uzeyir Hajibeyov, Arabzangi's part in Magomayev's "Shah Ismayil" opera and others. Besides that, Zeynab Khanlarova successfully performed in Azerbaijani folk music style – mugham. Zeynab Khanlarova's voice can be heard in such mugham compositions as "Shahnaz", "Gatar", "Bayati Shiraz" and in many others. Zeynab Khanlarova was also a very successful pop singer. Khanlarova's repertoire includes songs of such composers as Tofig Guliyev, Arif Malikov, Alekper Taghiyev, Emin Sabitoglu, Gara Garayev, Fikret Amirov and many other prominent composers. Khanlarova successfully performed songs in Russian, Armenian, Ukrainian, Romanian, Georgian, Persian, Arabic, Chinese, Indian, Turkish and in many other languages. Zeynab Khanlarova gave concerts in Russia, Ukraine, Latvia, Moldova, Belarus, Kazakhstan, Uzbekistan, Turkmenistan, India, China, Iran, Iraq, Egypt, Israel, Turkey, Georgia, Armenia, Bulgaria, Germany, Poland, Hungary, Austria, Finland, Sweden and Czech Republic.

Awards and titles
People's Artist of the Azerbaijan SSR (1975)
People's Artist of the Armenian SSR (1978)
People's Artist of the USSR (1980)
State Prize of the Azerbaijan SSR (1988)
Shohrat Order of Azerbaijan (1996)
Istiglal Order (2006)
Heydar Aliyev Order (2016)

References

1936 births
20th-century Azerbaijani women singers
Azerbaijani folk singers
People's Artists of Azerbaijan
People's Artists of Armenia
Musicians from Baku
People's Artists of the USSR
Soviet Azerbaijani people
Living people
Recipients of the Istiglal Order
Recipients of the Heydar Aliyev Order